Mr. Vocalist 2 is the seventh studio album by American singer-songwriter Eric Martin. Released on March 4, 2009 exclusively in Japan by Sony Music Japan, the album features Martin's covers of female-oriented western songs, as voted by fans on a RecoChoku poll.

The album peaked at No. 25 on Oricon's albums chart.

Mr. Vocalist 2 was released internationally as Timeless on September 23, 2009, as an Amazon.com exclusive. This release includes two Christmas songs as bonus tracks.

Track listing

Charts

References

External links
 
 
 

2009 albums
Eric Martin (musician) albums
Sony Music Entertainment Japan albums
Covers albums